Xanthodirphia is a genus of moths in the family Saturniidae first described by Charles Duncan Michener in 1949. It was originally established as a subgenus of the genus Ormiscodes.

Species
Xanthodirphia abbreviata Becker & Chacon, 2001
Xanthodirphia amarilla (Schaus, 1908)

References

Hemileucinae